Polygrammodes obsoletalis is a moth in the family Crambidae. It was described by Eugene G. Munroe in 1958. It is found in São Paulo, Brazil.

References

Spilomelinae
Moths described in 1958
Moths of South America